Gerald L. Eberlein (5 May 1930 – 12 August 2010) was a German sociology educator.

Biography
Eberlein was born in Berlin, Germany to Kurt Karl and Alice Caroline (b. Seiffermann) Eberlein.
Gerald L. Eberlein became Ph.D at the Technical University Stuttgart, Germany, in 1962. He was assistant professor at the University of Münster and at the Free University of Berlin, Germany, 1963-1970. Between 1971 and 1972 he was visiting professor at the Technical University of Berlin. 1972-1975 he was associate professor of philosophy of the social sciences, economy and politics at the University of the Saarland, Germany. Eberlein was professor of sociology at the Technical University of Munich, Germany, 1975-1998. In 1998 he became professor emeritus.

Gerald L. Eberlein has one child, Viviane Caroline. He was living in Pöcking, Germany at the time of his death.

Works
 Der Erfahrungsbegriff der heutigen empirischen Sozialforschung, 1963
 Theoretische Soziologie heute (with N. Dietrich), 1971
 Die Finalisierung der Wissenschaften, 1983
 Maximierung der Erkenntnisse ohne sozialen Sinn? Für eine wertbewusste Wissenschaft, 1987
 Schulwissenschaft, Parawissenschaft, Pseudowissenschaft, Stuttgart 1991

Editor
 Kleines Lexikon der Parawissenschaften, 1995
 Theory and Decision: An International Journal for Philosophy and Methodology of the Social Sciences, 1970–2001
 Theory and Decision Library: An International Series in Philosophy and Methodology of the Social and Behavioral Sciences, 1974–1998

Member
 Society for Scientific Exploration 
 Prof. Eberlein was a member of the scientific advisory board of the Nicolas-Benzin-Stiftung

References

External links
 An interview in the German magazine FOCUS

1930 births
2010 deaths
German sociologists
Academic staff of the Technical University of Munich
German male writers